Dolhasca is a town in Suceava County, in the historical region of Western Moldavia, northeastern Romania. Dolhasca is the eighth largest urban settlement in the county, with a population of 9,792 inhabitants, according to the 2011 census. It was declared a town in 2004, along with seven other localities in Suceava County. The town administers seven villages, namely: Budeni, Gulia, Poiana, Poienari, Probota, Siliștea Nouă, and Valea Poienei.

Despite being a town, Dolhasca looks like a rural settlement in many aspects, and the main occupation of the inhabitants is agriculture. The Probota Monastery, built in 1530 by the Moldavian ruler Petru Rareș, and located close to the town, is one of the Churches of Moldavia UNESCO World Heritage Site. Among Dolhasca's notable natives are comedian Alexandru Arșinel and neurosurgeon Constantin N. Arseni.

Demographics 

In 2002, Dolhasca had a population of 11,009 inhabitants, 90% of which were Romanians and the rest Roma. At that time, it was one of the most populated rural localities in Suceava County.

Administration and local politics

Town council 

The town's current local council has the following multi-party political composition, based on the results of the votes cast at the 2020 Romanian local elections:

Gallery

Notes

External links 

  Dolhasca Town Hall official site
  Ecomunitate – Dolhasca web page
  Suceava County site – Dolhasca web page

Towns in Romania
Populated places in Suceava County
Localities in Western Moldavia